The RSC Supramolecular Chemistry Award was a prestigious award that was made by the Royal Society of Chemistry for studies leading to the design of functionally useful supramolecular species. The first award was made in 2001 and the final award in 2020 following a review of the RSC Awards structure.  It was awarded biennially. 

In 2022 the award was revived by the RSC Macrocyclic and Supramolecular Chemistry interest group as the MASC Supramolecular Chemistry Award sponsored by Chem from Cell Press.

Recipients

See also

 List of chemistry awards

References

External links 

Awards established in 2001
Awards of the Royal Society of Chemistry